Shumaker-Lewis House, also known as Virgil A. Lewis House, was a historic home located in Mason, West Virginia.  It was built about 1885, and was a two-story Victorian-era frame cottage.  It featured a two tier Eastlake movement style porch.  It was the home of Virgil A. Lewis (1848-1912), the first State Historian and Archivist of West Virginia, 1905–1912.  It was the headquarters of the Mason City Historical Society. It was demolished in 2014 and the Virgil A. Lewis Park now occupies the site.

The house was listed on the National Register of Historic Places in 1979.

References

External links
e-WV, The Encyclopedia of West Virginia: Virgil A. Lewis

Houses on the National Register of Historic Places in West Virginia
Houses completed in 1885
Houses in Mason County, West Virginia
Stick-Eastlake architecture in West Virginia
National Register of Historic Places in Mason County, West Virginia
Victorian architecture in West Virginia
Buildings and structures demolished in 2014
Demolished buildings and structures in West Virginia